Robert Treat Paine (February 18, 1812 – February 8, 1872) was an American planter, ship builder and lawyer from Edenton, North Carolina. He served as a Colonel of volunteers in the Mexican–American War and represented North Carolina in the U.S. Congress as a Know Nothing. He was educated at Washington College (now Trinity College).

Paine moved to Texas in 1860 and resumed farming. He died in 1872 at Galveston and is buried in Prairie Lea Cemetery at Brenham, Texas.

References

External links
 
 Entry for Robert Treat Paine from the Biographical Encyclopedia of Texas published 1880, hosted by the Portal to Texas History.

1812 births
1872 deaths
People from Edenton, North Carolina
Know-Nothing members of the United States House of Representatives from North Carolina
Burials in Texas
19th-century American politicians
American military personnel of the Mexican–American War